Events in the year 1923 in India.

Incumbents
 Emperor of India – George V
 Viceroy of India – The Earl of Reading

Events
 National income - 29,403 million
 The Madras Province Swarajya Party was established under the leadership of S. Sathyamurthy and S. Srinivasa Iyengar.
 Swaraj Party established by C.R. Das and Motilal Nehru
 May 1 – Rahula College is established in Ceylon, under the name of "Parakramabhahu Vidyalaya".

Law
Workmen Compensation Act
Official Secrets Act
Indian Boilers Act
Cantonments (House-Accommodation) Act
Indian Naval Armament Act
Indian Merchant Shipping Act
Cotton Transport Act

Births
 
10 March – Ranjit Lal Jetley, soldier and scientist (died 2018).
21 March – Nirmala Srivastava, founder of Sahaja Yoga(died 2011).
5 April – M. Sarada Menon, psychiatrist and social worker (died 2021).
14 May – Mrinal Sen, producer of Bollywood films (died 2018).
15 May – Johnny Walker (actor), actor of Bollywood films (died 2003)
28 May – N. T. Rama Rao, actor, director, producer, and politician (died 1996).
9 July – Kovilan, novelist. (died 2010).
22 July – Mukesh, playback singer (died 1976).
28 July – H. S. S. Lawrence, educationalist.
1 September – Habib Tanvir, playwright, theatre director, poet and actor.(died 2009)
16 September – Ki. Rajanarayanan, folklorist and writer (died 2021)
26 September – Dev Anand, actor and film producer.(died 2011)
26 October – Ram Prakash Gupta, Chief Minister of Uttar Pradesh and governor of Madhya Pradesh (died 2004).
25 December – Swami Satyananda Saraswati, founder of Satyananda Yoga and Bihar Yoga (died 2009).

 
India
Years of the 20th century in India